Elizabeth Grace Nell Allen (born 28 May 1984) is a New Zealand actress. She has been acting since an early age and has appeared in several small productions and commercials since 1993. Her first major television role was in Cloud 9's The Legend of William Tell in 1998, in which she played Princess Vara. Internationally known for her role as Amber in The Tribe, she took on the role in 1998 for the first series, before deciding to leave the show to concentrate on her school work. She later returned for another three seasons.

Career

Allen's other works includes a lead role in the episode "The Green Dress" of the TV programme William Shatner's A Twist in the Tale in 1999 and guest parts in Xena: Warrior Princess and Revelations - The Initial Journey.

In 2006, she played the role of Ellie on Treasure Island Kids' Trilogy. She has also had guest roles on various television series, including Power Rangers: S.P.D., Outrageous Fortune and Power Rangers: Operation Overdrive.

In 2008 Allen joined Shortland Street as Dr Brooke Freeman, where she was a main cast member until 2014 when her character departed. Beth has also been involved in several theatre plays during her career, many produced by her husband's theatre company The Basement Theatre. Beth herself has helped produce a few plays, including Little Blonde Hen, and Vagina Monologues.

Personal life
Allen was born in Titirangi, New Zealand.

Allen married her long-term fiancee Charles McDermott in February 2011. The couple had a son Sidney born in 2016, a daughter Nell born in 2018, and Allen is currently expecting her third child due in June 2020 as confirmed by her in a new Podcast interview with The Tribe creator Ray Thompson on Youtube, uploaded on 4 April 2020.

Filmography

Theatre

References

External links

1984 births
Living people
New Zealand television actresses
People from Auckland
New Zealand soap opera actresses
20th-century New Zealand actresses
21st-century New Zealand actresses